Coiled-Coil Domain Containing 11, also known as CCDC11 is a protein that is encoded by CCDC11 gene located at chromosome 18 in humans.

Overview
The CCDC11 gene is located on chromosome 18q21.1 and is made of 39303 BP. The CCDC11 protein is made of 514 amino acids and has a mass of 61835 Da.  Its aliases include coiled-coil domain containing protein 11, FLJ32743, OTTHUMP00000163503.

Homology
CCDC has orthologs all the way back to betaproteobacteria which is a class of Proteobacteria. The following table represents a small selection of orthologs found using searches in BLAST and BLAT.  This is by no means a comprehensive list; however, it shows the diversity of species that CCDC11 is found.

Gene neighborhood 
The below image from NCBI shows the gene neighborhood of CCDC11 on chromosome 18.  CCDC11 has methyl-CPG binding domain protein 1, MBD1, upstream and myosin VB3, MYO5B, downstream.  All CCDC11, MBD1 and MYO5B are oriented negatively.  Note the close proximity between MBD1 and CCDC11.

Predicted Post-Translational Modification 
Tools on the ExPASy Proteomics site predict the following post-translational modifications:

One tool on the ExPASy, iPSORT, showed no signal peptide;however, it indicated CCDC11 to be mitochondrial.  Another tool on the ExPASy, SOSUI, indicated the protein to be a soluble protein.

References 

Genes
Human proteins